Flavia is a hot beverage system that prepares single servings of coffee, tea, and hot chocolate drinks.  The brand was owned by Mars Drinks, a division of Mars, Incorporated until October 1, 2018, when Lavazza purchased Mars’s coffee units.

Products
FLAVIA claims its patented technology brews drinks in a single serve "Fresh Pack" which means that the pack is the actual brewing chamber. The drink pours directly from the packet into the cup, rather than through a common channel. Used packs are collected in a tray that is emptied periodically when prompted.

The Fresh Packs are foil-sealed, protecting the ground coffees and teas from oxygen and moisture. FLAVIA markets several different machines, such as large coin-operated machines and small portable machines designed for home use.

History

Key events in the history of the product line include:

1982  The first Filterpack was manufactured in Basingstoke, UK
1984  FLAVIA launched its first brewer
1992  Launch in Japan
1996  Launch in US
1997  Launch in Canada
2005  FLAVIA Fusion home system launched in the US
2007  FLAVIA launches the Creation 400 for the US and UK
2009  FLAVIA undergoes a brand refresh with a new logo and the Think Fresh! tagline
2010  Mars Drinks acquires Alterra Coffee Roasters and launched The Bright Tea Company

Awards and achievements
In February 2006, the Flavia Fusion drinks station earned the Good Housekeeping Seal, which means that the product has a two-year limited warranty.

See also

 Coffee service
 Easy Serving Espresso Pod
 Caffitaly
 K-Cup
 T-Discs
 Melitta
 Senseo

References

External links

Flavia official site

Espresso machines
Single-serving coffee makers
Mars brands
Lavazza